Maurice Denuzière (born 29 August 1926 in Saint-Étienne) is a French journalist and writer.

Biography 
After studying journalism and a career in naval aeronautics, he embarked on journalism. In 1951, he became a chronicler for France-Soir and Le Monde. Passionate about writing, he is the author of several best sellers. Now that he has become a rather famous author, he is best known for his novel suite entitled Louisiana, in 6 volumes (1977–1987).

He was appointed a commandeur in the Ordre des Arts et des Lettres in January 2010.

Novels 
 Série Louisiane:
1977: Louisiane, (volume I), JC Lattès 
1979: Fausse-Rivière, (volume II), JC Lattès 
1981: Bagatelle, (volume III), JC Lattès
1985: Les Trois Chênes, (volume IV), Denoël
1987: L'Adieu au Sud, (volume  V), Denoël
1987: Les années Louisiane, (volume VI), Denoël
 Série Helvétie:
1992: Helvétie, (volume I)
1994: Rive-Reine, (volume II)
1996: Romandie, (volume III)
1998: Beauregard, (volume IV)
 Série Bahamas:
2003: Le Pont de Buena Vista, (volume I), Fayard
2005: Retour à Soledad, (volume II), Fayard
2007: Un paradis perdu, (volume III), Fayard

Other novels 
1959: Les Trois Dés, Éditions Julliard
1960: Une tombe en Toscane, Éditions Julliard
1961: L’Anglaise et le hibou, Éditions Julliard
1974: Comme un hibou au soleil, JC Lattès
2003: Pour amuser les coccinelles, Fayard
1979: Un chien de saison, JC Lattès
1982: Pour amuser les coccinelles, JC Lattès
1988: L'Amour flou, Denoël
2000: Le Cornac, Fayard
2001: Amélie ou la concordance des temps, Fayard
2009: L'Alsacienne, Fayard
2011: Un homme sans ambition, Fayard

Trivia 
Boulevard des Italiens (1875-1975), Photos by John Craven, Draeger
1973: Enquête sur la fraude fiscale, JC Lattès
1973: Lettres de l’étranger, chronicles, JC Lattès
1963: Les Délices du port, essay, Ed. Fleurus
1982: Alerte en Stéphanie, tale, Hachette Jeunesse
1986: La trahison des apparences, short stories, Ed. de l’Amitié
1990: Je te nomme Louisiane, narrative, Denoël
1998: Et pourtant elle tourne, chronicles, Fayard
1990: La Louisiane: du coton au pétrole, Denoël
2010: Du Mississippi au Léman, itinéraire historique, l'Aire
2013: La Dix-Huitième Etoile, histoire de la Louisiane américaine, Fayard

References

External links 
 Maurice Denuzière : Helvétie on YouTube

20th-century French novelists
21st-century French novelists
20th-century French journalists
21st-century French journalists
Prix Maison de la Presse winners
Commandeurs of the Ordre des Arts et des Lettres
1926 births
Writers from Saint-Étienne
Living people
French male novelists
French male journalists
Le Monde writers
20th-century French male writers
21st-century French male writers